Environmental Modelling & Software is a peer-reviewed academic journal of environmental modelling.

Editors-in-chief

1998–2016, Anthony Jakeman, Australian National University

2016–present, Daniel P. Ames, Brigham Young University

References

Earth and atmospheric sciences journals
Environmental science journals
Elsevier academic journals
English-language journals